Defence Munitions (DM) Kineton occupies the site officially known as MOD Kineton, and is a Ministry of Defence property located close to the village of Kineton, Warwickshire, England.

History
Developed as a Central Ammunition Depot, it also served during the Second World War as a Royal Pioneer Corps camp.

Defence Munitions Kineton is now the largest ammunition depot in western Europe. The base stores more than 60% of the entire Ministry of Defence’s munitions.

Rail links
Defence Munitions Kineton extends to 2200 acres. The building of the M40 motorway cut the line for a time, but after a new bridge was built, the line was rebuilt in its entirety with deep ballast and fully welded joints.

Based units
The site also houses the Defence Explosive Ordnance Disposal, Munitions and Search Training Regiment, and there is an extensive military family married quarters patch at Temple Herdewyke, along with its associated information centre, Kineton HIVE.

References

External links
Kineton HIVE—archived link at the UK National Archives

Buildings and structures in Warwickshire
Ammunition dumps in England
Military railways in the United Kingdom
Installations of the Ministry of Defence (United Kingdom)